Vanessa Glođo (born 8 June 1974), often credited as Vanessa Glodjo, is a Bosnia and Hercegovinian actress. She is best known for her roles in In the Land of Blood and Honey (2011) and Ja sam iz Krajine, zemlje kestena (2013).

Vanesa Glođo was born in Sarajevo. During the Bosnian War, Glođo's leg was wounded by sniper-fire.

Filmography

Films

Neočekivana šetnja (1998)
Jours tranquilles à Sarajevo (1999)
Heroes (1999)
Life Is a Miracle (2004)
Go West (2005)
Grbavica (2006)
All for Free (2006)
Nafaka (2006)
Duhovi Sarajeva (2007)
Mona Lisa Has Vanished (2009)
On the Path (2010)
In the Land of Blood and Honey (2011)
Ja sam iz Krajine, zemlje kestena (2013)
Hiljadarka (2015)

Television

Zaboravljena poslovica (2003)
Crna hronika (2004)
Život je čudo (2006)
Lud, zbunjen, normalan (2008)
Dva smo svijeta različita (2011)
Kriza (2013–14)

References

External links

1974 births
Living people
Actresses from Sarajevo
Bosniaks of Bosnia and Herzegovina
20th-century Bosnia and Herzegovina actresses
21st-century Bosnia and Herzegovina actresses
Bosnia and Herzegovina film actresses
Bosnia and Herzegovina television actresses